Sanjib Chattopadhyay (born 24 october 1936 in Kolkata, India) is an Indian Bengali novelist and writer of short stories. His style is characterized by use of short satirical sentences mixed with very lively language.

Childhood and education
Sanjib Chattopadhyay spent his childhood in the hilly terrain of Chota Nagpur Plateau<ref
name="blurb">Blurb of Dashti Kishore Upanyas, collection of novels by Sanjib Chattopadhyay, Kolkata: Ananda Publishers, 2012</ref> under the care of his father after his mother died when he was five. They relocated to Calcutta and he was admitted to Victoria Institution school which he joined at grade seven. He later graduated from the Scottish Church College where he studied chemistry.

Work
The subjects of his fiction are mostly families living in Calcutta city. Within the confines of these homes, he challenges the moral values of the fast-changing middle class of the city. Chattopadhyay frequently uses old men as his protagonists. These aged characters create the spiritual and philosophical edge found in his novels Lotakambal (The Vessel and Quilt) and Shakha Prasakha (Branches). Arguably the most famous of his creations is Lotakambal. His most famous novella Swet Patharer Table (The Ivory Table) is an example of his characteristic style of story-telling which mixes tension, dilemma, curiosity, pity, humor, and satire. He has written fiction for children and continues to write for magazines and newspapers. Chattopdhyay's current writing is related to Ramkrishna Paramhansa Sarada Devi and Swami Vivekananda. Some of his major works apart from the above-mentioned are:

 Parampadokamale (At His Divine Feet)
 Cancer
 Duti Chair (Two Chairs)
 Roshe Boshe
 Rakish Maa Roshe Boshe
 Besh Achhi Roshe Boshe
 Tumi Aar Aami (You And I)
 Eke Eke (One By One)
 Kolkata Achhe Kolkatatei (Calcutta Is In Calcutta)
 Sheuli - A novel about a family consisting of grandfather, grandmother, father, mother and their son and daughter with many aspirations nestled inside satire.
 Mapa Hashi Chapa Kanna (a book on satire)
 Halka Hashi Chokher Jol (a book on satire) [Light Smile Tears]
 Ujan Beye Jai
 Mojar Foara
 Bhagabaner Kaane Dilen Bhagabaner Naam by Dey's Publishing
 Nirbane Anirban Buddha Bhagaban  by Dey's Publishing
 BHOR HOLO by Patra Bharati
 Ka Tobo Kanta by Dey's Publishing
 Porokiya by Patra Bharati
 BRAMHADATYIR BACCHA by Patra Bharati  

Apart from these, his notable juvenile literature includes the Ruku-Suku and Badomama-Mejomama series (recompiled & published as Mama Samagra by KGB Prakashani) which are fun-filled and analyse various philosophical aspects of life through the eyes of children.

Awards
 Chattopadhyay is the recipient of the Ananda Puraskar in 1981.
 He received the Banga Bibhushan award from the Govt. of West Bengal in May, 2012.
 He received the Sahitya Akademi Award in 2018 for his novel Sri Krishner Sesh Kota Din at an age of 82 years.

References

Bengali writers
Bengali-language writers
Bengali male poets
Bengali-language poets
Indian children's writers
Indian male novelists
Scottish Church College alumni
University of Calcutta alumni
Recipients of the Ananda Purashkar
1936 births
Living people
20th-century Indian novelists
Poets from West Bengal
20th-century Indian poets
Indian male poets
Novelists from West Bengal
20th-century Indian male writers
Recipients of the Sahitya Akademi Award in Bengali
 Writers from Kolkata